Anne Weldon Bernard (died 5 December 1746) was an English aristocrat and philanthropist.

Anne Weldon was the daughter of Robert Weldon (or Weildon) of St. Lawrence Jewry, who was a mercer in Fleet Street, London. On 26 May 1692 she married Sir Robert Bernard, 3rd Bt., at St. Margaret's Church, Westminster. Their son John, born c. 1695 at Brampton, Huntingdonshire. became 4th Bt.

She became the second wife of Thomas Trevor, 1st Baron Trevor, on 25 September 1704. They had three sons, the second of whom, Robert Hampden-Trevor, 1st Viscount Hampden, succeeded to Trevor's barony after his elder brothers (issue of Trevor's first wife, Elizabeth Searle) died. Her third son, Richard Trevor (1707–1771), was Bishop of St Davids from 1744 to 1752, and then Bishop of Durham.

She was a signatory to Thomas Coram's petition to King George II to establish the Foundling Hospital. She signed on 2 December 1734.

She died on 5 December 1746, and was buried on 13 December 1746 at Bromham, Bedfordshire.

References 

Year of birth missing
1746 deaths
English baronesses
English philanthropists
English women philanthropists
Wives of baronets